John Salerne may refer to:

John Salerne (died 1415), MP for Rye and Hastings
John Salerne (died 1410), MP for Winchelsea and New Romney